John Denham Parsons (1861 – 14 September 1936) was an English writer and Shakespeare authorship theorist.

Biography

Parsons was a proponent of the Baconian theory of Shakespeare authorship. Between 1918 and 1935 he published many works on this topic, including articles in Baconiana and letters in the correspondence columns of Notes and Queries and The Times Literary Supplement. He attempted pamphlet controversy with Sir Sidney Lee and authorities at the British Museum over the Shakespeare authorship question.

Parsons' book The Non-Christian Cross (1896) argued that the Christian cross symbol is not Christian in origin.

He was a member of the Society for Psychical Research. Parsons authored a 561 page book The Nature and Purpose of the Universe on philosophy and psychical research, published in 1906.

Selected publications 

 Our Sun-God: Or Christianity Before Christ, 1895
 The Non-Christian Cross: An Enquiry into the Origin and History of the Symbol Eventually Adopted as That of Our Religion, 1896
 The Nature and Purpose of the Universe, 1906
 The Great Taboo in English Literary Circles, 1919
 Ben Johnson and Sir Sidney Lee, 1920
 Boycotted Shakespeare Facts: Being a Preliminary Report Upon the Admissible, 1920
 William Shakespeare, 1920
 Bacon: Being an account of seven years of refusal by the accepted authorities to supply a reasoned judgement concerning certain new evidence affecting.. the identity of the poet Shakespeare, 1922
 The British Museum and Shakespeare's identity, 1924
 Did "Shake-speare" signal?

References

External links
 
 
 

1861 births
1936 deaths
Baconian theory of Shakespeare authorship
English male non-fiction writers
Parapsychologists
Shakespeare authorship theorists
People from South Stoneham